Rooms To Go is an American furniture store chain.

The company was founded in September 1990 by Jeffrey and Morty Seaman, when they sold Seaman Furniture Company. According to Furniture Today, Rooms To Go is the 3rd largest furniture retailer in the US.

History

1933–1990: Seaman's 

Julius Seaman opened his first store in 1933. His enterprise gradually increased to an annual $150,000 in sales and allowed him to send his two sons to the Wharton School of the University of Pennsylvania. "His big[gest] goal in life was that his boys would follow him and build up his business," Morton Seaman told Forbes. Julius Seaman died at the age of 48 of a heart attack. He left Morton, the elder son and college graduate, to help his mother save for the business, while Carl, still in school, worked at weekends and during vacations.

In 1955, they spent $1,000 on the store's first ad. It was a full-page spread in a local paper. When sales tripled, the same week the ad was published, Morton decided to open a second store to reduce the cost of advertisement per unit. By 1971 there were seven Seaman stores.

In 1988, Seaman's Furniture was taken over in a buyout by Kohlberg Kravis Roberts & Co. Jeffrey Seaman, son of Morton Seaman, was 28 at the time, but he shouldered a large portion of the buying duties for the company. He and his father developed an overseas program during Seaman's restructuring phase.

1990: Founding of Rooms To Go 
Rooms To Go was founded in 1990 by Jeffrey and Morty Seaman after selling Seaman's Furniture. They opened the first Rooms To Go in Orlando, Florida on September 7, 1990. Rooms To Go's founding concept was the sale of whole room packages, using the slogan: "Buy the piece, save a little. Buy the room, save a lot!" Furniture was offered in predesigned rooms, targeted at consumers looking to save both time and money, without sacrificing quality, when shopping for home furnishings.
Jeffrey Seaman envisioned a different merchandising approach that reflected his experiences as well as successful trends in retail, not necessarily the furniture business alone. This included trends such as bright, colorful stores, large glass walls, and a friendly atmosphere. 
Seaman was comfortable sharing authority and information leading to the assembly of his executive management team. Throughout this time, Morty Seaman took on an advisory role to his son which Jeffrey Seaman has said was essential to the early success of the company.

1991-Present: Rooms To Go 
After its founding, Rooms To Go implemented an advanced computer system to manage inventory flow and streamline the operations process. Additionally, stores were designed with an open layout so customers could easily view the merchandise from any vantage point.
Rooms To Go became the first major furniture chain to offer stores exclusively for children's furniture, filling a large gap in the youth market.
By 1996, Rooms To Go had become Florida's fastest-growing furniture retailer. In order to avoid saturating the Florida market, Rooms To Go expanded into Atlanta, Georgia; Charlotte, North Carolina; and Chattanooga and Nashville, Tennessee. In 1998, Rooms To Go expanded to the Texas region, a move that led to a 20 percent growth in revenue from the previous year.
In 2018, Rooms To Go acquired outdoor furniture store chain Carls Patio and created Rooms To Go Outdoor, a division specializing in outdoor furniture.

Distribution centers 

 Suwanee, Georgia
 Dunn, North Carolina
 Arlington, Texas
 Katy, Texas
 Seffner, Florida
 Lakeland, Florida
 Pearl River, Louisiana
 Lebanon, Tennessee

Products

Rooms To Go Kids 
In 1997, Rooms To Go opened its first Rooms To Go Kids location in Marietta, Georgia, a division which specializes in baby and children's furniture.

Cindy Crawford Home 
Rooms To Go has been partnered with Cindy Crawford for over 10 years.  The Cindy Crawford Home collection focuses on living room, bedroom, and dining room furniture.

Disney Collection 
Rooms To Go landed Walt Disney's first license to produce kids' bedroom suites featuring Disney characters. Rooms To Go's Cinderella, Winnie the Pooh, and Pumpkin Carriage bedrooms were nominated as the most innovative new products launched under the Walt Disney & Co. label in 2005.

NFL Collection 
In the summer of 2008, Rooms To Go rolled out a licensed line of customizable NFL furniture after striking a deal with the National Football League.

Sofia Vergara Collection 
In March 2013, Rooms To Go announced a partnership with Modern Family star Sofia Vergara.  On her partnership with Rooms To Go, Vergara has said: "My relationship with Rooms To Go began over 15 years ago when I moved to the United States as a single mother, and furnished my first apartment entirely from their store."  The Sofia Vergara Collection offers contemporary living room, bedroom, and dining room sets.

Eric Church "Highway to Home" 
Rooms To Go began selling Eric Church's "Highway to Home" furniture collection in 2016. "This collection of bedroom, dining room, upholstery and occasional pieces is inspired by Eric's eclectic music and lifestyle."  Before moving to Nashville, Church worked in a furniture manufacturing plant, and his father continues to work in the industry.

Rooms To Go Outdoor 
In 2018, Rooms To Go acquired outdoor furniture store chain Carls Patio and began a rollout of Rooms To Go Outdoor stores, a division which specializes in patio and other outdoor furniture.

See also 
Seaman's Furniture

References

External links 

 

1990 establishments in Florida
Companies based in Florida
Retail companies established in 1990
Furniture retailers of the United States
American companies established in 1990